The 1989 European Indoors was a women's tennis tournament played on indoor carpet courts at the Saalsporthalle Allmend in Zürich in Switzerland and was part of the Category 4 of the 1989 WTA Tour. It was the sixth edition of the tournament and was held from 16 October through 22 October 1989. First-seeded Steffi Graf won the singles title  and earned $50,000 first-prize money.

Finals

Singles
 Steffi Graf defeated  Jana Novotná 6–1, 7–6(8–6)
 It was Graf's 12th singles title of the year and the 42nd of her career.

Doubles
 Jana Novotná /  Helena Suková defeated  Nathalie Tauziat /  Judith Wiesner 6–3, 3–6, 6–4

Prize money and ranking points

Notes

References

External links
 ITF tournament edition details
 Tournament draws

European Indoors
Zurich Open
1989 in Swiss tennis